Joseph McMoneagle (born January 10, 1946) is a retired U.S. Army Chief Warrant Officer. He was involved in remote viewing (RV) operations and experiments conducted by U.S. Army Intelligence and the Stanford Research Institute. He was among the first personnel recruited for the classified program now known as the Stargate Project (1978–95). Along with colleague Ingo Swann, McMoneagle is best known for claims surrounding the investigation of RV and the use of paranormal abilities for military intelligence gathering. His interests also include near-death experiences, out-of-body travel, and unidentified flying objects.

Biography

Early years
McMoneagle describes a remarkable memory of very early childhood events. He grew up surrounded by alcoholism, abuse and poverty. As a child, he had visions at night when scared, and began to hone his psychic abilities in his teens for his own protection when he hitchhiked. He enlisted in the Army in 1964, at the age of 18, to get away from the family turmoil. McMoneagle subsequently became an experimental remote viewer while serving in U.S. Army Intelligence.

Military career
McMoneagle's early career was as an NCO and he retired after 20 years as a chief warrant officer. He was severely injured in a helicopter accident in Vietnam. He was involved in intelligence work for 15 years. From 1978, he was known as "Remote Viewer No. 1" at Project Stargate — the U.S. Army's psychic intelligence unit at Fort Meade, Maryland. At his retirement McMoneagle earned his Legion of Merit for his last ten years of service, including five years of work in SIGINT (SIGnals INTelligence) and five years in the RV program. He retired from the Army in 1984, but continued work as a consultant at Stargate until 1993.

Post-retirement
In 1995, funding for Project Stargate was terminated and the unit was decommissioned after the official finding that "no discernible benefit had been established". McMoneagle became a speaker at the Monroe Institute, where he had previously been sent as part of his RV training. McMoneagle then ran an RV business aimed at the corporate world called Intuitive Intelligence Applications, Inc. His services included that "he can help a wildcatter find an oil well or a quarry operator know where to mine".

Views and assertions
According to McMoneagle, remote viewing is possible and accurate outside the boundaries of time. He believes he has remote-viewed into the past, present, and future and has predicted events. Among the subjects he claims to have remote-viewed are a Chinese nuclear facility, the Iranian hostage crisis, the Red Brigades, and Muammar Qadhafi. He writes that he predicted the location and existence of the Soviet "Typhoon"-class submarine in 1979, and that in mid-January 1980, satellite photos confirmed those predictions. McMoneagle says the military remote viewing program was ended partly due to stigma: "Everybody wanted to use it, but nobody wanted to be caught dead standing next to it. There's an automatic ridicule factor. 'Oh, yeah, psychics.' Anybody associated with it could kiss their career goodbye." Supporters of his claims include Charles Tart.

According to author Paul H. Smith, McMoneagle predicted "several months" into the future, and McMoneagle's own accounts provide differing claims of the accuracy of his remote viewing, varying from 5 to 95 percent to between 65 and 75 percent. McMoneagle claims that remote viewing is not always accurate but that it was able to locate hostages and downed airplanes. Of other psychics, he says that "Ninety-eight percent of the people are kooks."

McMoneagle's predictions included the passing of a teenager's "Right to Work" Bill, a new religion without the emphasis of Christianity, a science of the soul, a vaccine for AIDS, a movement to eliminate television, and a 'temporary tattoo' craze that would replace the wearing of clothing, all of which were supposed to take place between 2002 and 2006.

He reports that he worked with Dean Radin at the Consciousness Research Laboratory, University of Nevada, Las Vegas to seek patentable ideas via remote viewing for a "future machine" Radin conceived. McMoneagle also says he has worked on missing person cases in Washington, San Francisco, New York and Chicago, as well as employing remote viewing as a time machine to make various observations such as the origin of the human species. According to McMoneagle, humans came from creatures somewhat like sea otters rather than primates and were created in a laboratory by creators who "seeded" the earth and then departed.

Media appearances
McMoneagle was featured on a National Geographic Channel episode of "Naked Science" along with parapsychologist Edwin C. May who tested McMoneagle's ability to "remote view" six locations in the San Francisco Bay area, with mixed results.

In 1994, McMoneagle appeared on an ABC network television special Put to the Test also with Edwin May who said that "About 20 per cent of what Joe does is as close to spectacular as I can possibly wish. Scientists don't like to use the term "miracle" very often, but this is as close to one as you can imagine". According to Dean Radin, "The best psychic averages about 3 in 10, like the best baseball hitters .300, the rest of us bat about 1 or 2 in 10." According to paranormal researcher Brian Dunning "The only thing I found impressive about McMoneagle's demonstration was their editing and narration job to make it look like the most amazing and miraculous psychic feat in history." The show took a 15-minute test and edited it down to 2 minutes leaving only what the producers felt were the best hits. After McMoneagle's vague pronouncements of a metallic sound, a pedestrian bridge, something tall that is not a building, a river or running water, something with a stripe on it and perpendicular lines.

In 1995, McMoneagle defended the Stargate program in an interview for the Washington Post.

McMoneagle co-wrote an episode of the psychic science fiction show The Dead Zone. In the episode, remote viewing was used in the hunt for Osama Bin Laden. USA Network, which aired The Dead Zone, canceled the episode's initially scheduled broadcast because of concern about the subject matter, but did air the program a few months later, after the series returned from a mid-season hiatus.

In 2002, McMoneagle started receiving regular coverage on Nippon Television's prime-time Chounouryoku Sousakan show (roughly translated, "FBI: Psychic Investigator"), during which he performed remote viewings related to unsolved police cases.

In 2004, in Jon Ronson's Crazy Rulers of the World documentary (Episode 3, "The Psychic Footsoldiers", Channel 4), McMoneagle was interviewed and vividly described his technique for traveling "out of body" to Communist China to remotely view a trigger mechanism in a military nuclear weapons laboratory.

Books

References

External links
 Official website of Joseph and Nancy McMoneagle
 

1946 births
Living people
United States Army officers
Recipients of the Legion of Merit
American occult writers
American psychics
Parapsychologists
Remote viewers